The 1981 Texas–Arlington Mavericks football team was an American football team that represented the University of Texas at Arlington in the Southland Conference during the 1981 NCAA Division I-A football season. In their eighth year under head coach Harold Elliott, the team compiled a 6–5 record and was Southland Conference champion.

Schedule

References

Texas–Arlington
Texas–Arlington Mavericks football seasons
Southland Conference football champion seasons
Texas–Arlington Mavericks football